Al Kharsaah (also spelled Al Khuraisa) is a village in Qatar located in the municipality of Al-Shahaniya, approximately 80 km west of the capital Doha. Nearby areas include Umm Washah, Umm Al-Jaljam, Umm Bab and Umm Taqa. It hosts a stage of the Qatar International Rally.

History
In 1908, J.G. Lorimer documented Al Kharsaah in his Gazetteer of the Persian Gulf, giving its location as "11 miles north-east of the foot of Dohat as-Salwa and 6 from the west coast". He refers to it as a Bedouin camping ground and notes that there is good water at 18 fathoms in a masonry well.

Geography
Al Kharsaah has a very low elevation and there is a small amount of vegetation. Locals speculate that the area was the site of a meteorite impact, owing to its low elevation and rough surface. However, Qatari geologists believe that the area was once a large cave, but that natural factors caused the ceiling of the cave to collapse.

Infrastructure
The village has 30 houses, half of which are inhabited full-time, and the other half of which are inhabited only on the weekends by locals who spend most of their time in Doha. Public services are limited. There are two primary schools; one for boys and one for girls.

The Qatar Electricity and Water Company (QEWC) designated land in Al Kharsaah for a major solar power project in 2017. As part of the project, a solar power plant with a production capacity of 500 MW is planned to be inaugurated by 2020. Costs of the projects predicted to be upwards of $500 million.

External links
Al Kharsaah at placesmap.net

References

Populated places in Al-Shahaniya